Muqaam is a 2022 Indian Hindi-language film. The film was made by the Ravi Ram Production company. The film was written and directed by Uma Prakash and produced by Ravi Sharma. The movie was released in Hungama on 28 April 2022.

Cast
 Sandeep Bose as Saleem
 Prabhakar Srinet as Tahir
 Nidhi Pandey as Disha
 Mahendra Sriwas as Chandu
 Aditi Awasthi as Zoya
 Neeraj Kumar Tyagi as Muhammad

References

External links 

2022 drama films
2022 films
2020s Hindi-language films